Charles Burroughs may refer to:

 Charles Burroughs (academic), art historian
 Charles Burroughs (athlete) (1876–1902), American track and field athlete